Oedipus Wrecks may refer to:

 Oedipus Wrecks (Lois & Clark), an episode in the 3rd season of the television series Lois & Clark: The New Adventures of Superman
 Oedipus Wrecks, one of the three short stories in the film New York Stories

See also
Oedipus Complex